The National Committee on Foreign Medical Education and Accreditation is a committee within the US Department of Education. It is responsible for assessing the accreditation standards of non-US medical schools and determining if those standards are "comparable" with US standards. The Committee does not license or accredit foreign medical schools directly.

References

External links
 Website

Medical education in the United States